Dario Jertec (born 5 September 1985) is a retired Croatian football midfielder.

Club career
During his time with NK Varteks he was often described as a fast dribbler who always faces opponent's goal frontally. He moved to Dinamo Zagreb in the winter break of the 2006–2007 season, along with his Varteks teammate Nikola Pokrivač, but failed to establish himself as a regular at the club and in August 2007 he was sent on loan to Dinamo's league rivals HNK Rijeka until the end of the 2007–2008 season. In June 2008, he came to Hajduk Split from Dinamo Zagreb. In 2010 Jertec joined Saudi Arabian club Al-Faisaly. In July 2012 Jertec move to Qadsia SC of Kuwait for 320 thousand dollars, include the value of the penalty clause peer terminate his contract with Al-Faisaly, gets "Dario" on $100 thousand as a provider contract, while the rest of the contract value will be in picture of monthly salaries.

In July 2013 he moved to Fujairah for a one-year contract with one-year extension.

On 10 September 2019, Jertec moved to Australia, signing for newly formed A-League club Western United FC. Due to the COVID-19 pandemic, Jertec departed United to return to Croatia.

References

External links
Dario Jertec profile at Nogometni Magazin 
 

1985 births
Living people
Sportspeople from Varaždin
Association football midfielders
Croatian footballers
Croatia under-21 international footballers
NK Čakovec players
NK Varaždin players
GNK Dinamo Zagreb players
HNK Rijeka players
HNK Hajduk Split players
Al-Faisaly FC players
Qadsia SC players
Al-Taawoun FC players
NK Zavrč players
Hajer FC players
Western United FC players
Croatian Football League players
Saudi Professional League players
Kuwait Premier League players
Slovenian PrvaLiga players
A-League Men players
Croatian expatriate footballers
Expatriate footballers in Saudi Arabia
Croatian expatriate sportspeople in Saudi Arabia
Expatriate footballers in Kuwait
Croatian expatriate sportspeople in Kuwait
Expatriate footballers in Slovenia
Croatian expatriate sportspeople in Slovenia
Expatriate soccer players in Australia
Croatian expatriate sportspeople in Australia